The 2012 Japan Golf Tour season was played from 12 April to 2 December. The season consisted of 25 official money events in Japan as well as the four majors and the four World Golf Championships.

Schedule
The following table lists official events during the 2012 season.

Unofficial events
The following events were sanctioned by the Japan Golf Tour, but did not carry official money, nor were wins official.

Money list
The money list was based on prize money won during the season, calculated in Japanese yen.

Notes

References

External links

Japan Golf Tour
Japan Golf Tour
Golf Tour